Vincent Millot (born 30 January 1986, in Montpellier, France) is a French former professional tennis player. Despite never having reached the top 100, Millot has played at each of the four Grand Slam events.

ATP Challenger and ITF Futures finals

Singles: 24 (6–18)

Doubles: 3 (1–2)

Performance timeline

Singles

References

External links
 
 

Living people
French male tennis players
1986 births
Sportspeople from Dijon
20th-century French people
21st-century French people